Kumarakom Bird Sanctuary (also known as Vembanad Bird Sanctuary) is situated at Kumarakom in Kottayam taluk of Kottayam district in the Indian state of Kerala, on the banks of Vembanad Lake. Set in the Kerala Backwaters, the bird sanctuary is visited by many migratory bird species.

History
Developed in a rubber plantation as a bird sanctuary by Englishman George Alfred Baker, the sanctuary was formerly known as Baker's Estate. The Kerala Tourism Development Corporation currently manages the sanctuary.

Geography

State Highway No. 1 leads to Kochi and Thiruvananthapuram in opposite directions.

Neighbouring areas such as Kaipuzha Muttu, Pathirmanal, Narakathara, Thollairam Kayal, and Poothanpandi Kayal are also good locations for spotting birds.

Fauna
The main attractions are local birds like waterfowl, koel, owl, egret, heron, cormorant, moorhen, darter, and brahminy kite, as well as the migratory gull, teal, tern, flycatcher, and other birds are seen here during their respective migratory seasons. Some of the migratory birds come from the Himalayas, and a few from Siberia.

In 2008, WWF-India organised a two-day bird watching programme at the sanctuary in connection with World Wetlands Day.

References

External links
 Thattekad Bird Sanctuary

Bird sanctuaries of Kerala
Geography of Kottayam district
Tourist attractions in Kottayam district
Malabar Coast moist forests
Protected areas with year of establishment missing